K270BW (101.9 MHz, branded as NewsTalkSTL) is a conservative talk radio station serving Greater St. Louis, located in Bellefontaine Neighbors, Missouri. It is transmitted with an effective radiated power of 250 watts. Its transmitter is located in St. Louis, while the studio is located near Union Station in downtown St. Louis, and serves as the translator of sister outlet KLJY, where it can be heard on their third HD radio subchannel.

Formerly a translator for the national K-Love network, "Boost 101.9" was launched on March 24, 2014, with a unique presentation designed to serve young listeners using hit music with positive lyrics and messages.

On January 4, 2021, Gateway Creative Broadcasting acquired the 95.5 FM signal in St. Louis and changed call letters to KXBS, and moved the "Boost Radio" format to that frequency. KXBS covers the entire metro area of St. Louis. After several months of simulcasting, K270BW flipped to conservative talk as "NewsTalkSTL" on July 19, 2021, and began relaying KLJY's HD3 subchannel. The station began simulcasting on KNBS (94.1 FM) on August 9.

References

External links
Official website for NewsTalkSTL

270BW
Radio stations established in 2014
2014 establishments in Missouri
Educational Media Foundation radio stations
Conservative talk radio
Talk radio stations in the United States